Linda McClain is the Robert B. Kent Professor of Law at Boston University School of Law, and was previously the Rivkin Radler Distinguished Professor of Law at Hofstra Law School. McClain's work focuses on family law, sex equality, and feminist legal theory.

Biography

McClain studied religion and government at Oberlin College and continued her education at the University of Chicago Divinity School, graduating with a master's degree in religious studies. She received her J.D. from Georgetown University Law Center, where she was an editor for The Georgetown Law Journal. Upon graduation, McClain worked as an attorney in the litigation department at Cravath, Swaine & Moore, and earned her LL.M. from New York University School of Law in 1991. That year, she began her academic career at Hofstra Law School, where she was appointed the Rivkin Radler Distinguished Professor of Law and the co-director of the Institute for the Study of Gender, Law, and Policy. McClain married James E. Fleming in 1992.

McClain started teaching at Boston University School of Law in 2007. She also teaches in the Boston University College of Arts & Sciences in the Women's, Gender, & Sexuality Studies Program. She is a member of the American Law Institute, where she works in the Members Consultative Group for the Restatement of the Law, Children and the Law. She is also involved in the Council on Contemporary Families, the American Political Science Association, and the American Society for Political and Legal Philosophy.

McClain has previously served as the chair of the Association of American Law Schools Section on Family and Juvenile Law, and on the advisory board for The Feminist Sexual Ethics Project at Brandeis University. She has appeared on C-SPAN and Minnesota Public Radio.

McClain is admitted to the bar in New York.

Scholarship

Constitutional theory
With her husband, James E. Fleming, McClain defends traditional liberal rights in Ordered Liberty: Rights, Responsibilities, and Virtues, and attempts to show there is a middle ground between liberal, civic republican, communitarian, and progressive camps. Individual rights not only protect individuals, but also enable citizens to responsibly and autonomously choose how to be a good citizen. Fleming and McClain argue this "responsibility as autonomy," exercised when government does not attempt to steer citizens in a particular direction, is different from "responsibility as accountability" to society advocated by communitarians. They advance that government can provide information and support for all alternatives that allow individuals to reflect and choose what is best. Critics think this is easier in theory than in practice; differently situated individuals can interpret the intended persuasion behind the same piece of information differently.  Additionally, if government intervention is necessary to create conditions for an individual to be able to make an autonomous choice, for example, "the material and social preconditions for women's equal citizenship," it is probable the government will have to restrict others' autonomy. Although McClain and Fleming's argument relies on the belief that individuals will usually choose to act in the best interests of society, they acknowledge that rights should not be absolute; they should be limited when there is a stronger competing interest. McClain and Fleming examine a line of Supreme Court abortion cases, an area communitarians identify with absolute rights, and note that the balancing of individual rights and state interests is taking place, not the application of strict scrutiny, intermediate scrutiny, or the rational basis test. When the public is reasonably divided whether an action, for example, abortion, should be permissible, McClain and Fleming argue that it should be left to individual choice, and McClain has explained that an individual right is necessary to give the individual space to make the important decision autonomously. This line of reasoning sees the Constitution as a living document, changing with the needs of society.  Tolerance of different approaches, which McClain has argued should be "toleration as respect" as opposed to grudging tolerance, should only be disrupted if a policy is supported by the best reasons provided through public debate. Individuals engaging in public debate in a "deliberative democracy" should not be focused on imposing their view of what is good on everyone else, but instead seek to achieve a common good. Critics of tolerance argue that it does not provide sufficient guidance and creates tacit approval of actions that have not been considered by society. When discussing constitutional rights, however, freedom is defined as freedom from government action; private actors are still free to disapprove of others' actions.

McClain has noted that public debate can identify the best societal values for democracy and that these values can then be used to comprise civics education required by the state, even if that requirement conflicts with religious liberty interests of groups (e.g., homeschoolers). One counterargument is whether government can be trusted to teach these values, especially when they question the wisdom of those in power and the laws as written.

McClain and Fleming have also argued that, when the consequences of not having a choice would negatively impact individuals in a personal way, denying individuals that choice would create a moral harm. For example, prior to the legalization of same-sex marriage in the United States, McClain argued that failure to recognize same-sex marriages was disrespectful to same-sex couples and prevented them from fully functioning in democratic life. Although Fleming and McClain claimed to be advocating political liberalism, critics felt examples in Ordered Liberty pushed beyond the natural understanding of citizenship and into the traditionally more private sphere associated with comprehensive liberalism. Others argued that the examples chosen, primarily in family law and equality cases, lent themselves to an autonomy as self-government argument. It is harder to apply the same theory to other rights such as free speech cases involving offensive and disrespectful language or zealous protection of a criminal defendant's procedural rights. Arguments regarding individual rights and autonomy are also difficult to apply in a post Citizens United world where organizations possess constitutional rights. 

McClain has also defended liberalism against feminist critique that encouraging autonomy leads to socially disconnected individuals, arguing that, although rights necessarily create some protective space between individuals, liberal theory also allows for interdependency that can result in increased individual self-worth and respect amongst individuals.

Religious liberty
When religions proscribe rights and responsibilities associated with marriage, McClain has argued that these religious communities be exempt from secular domestic relations law instead of trying to fit the religious law within state law.

Reproductive rights
McClain has examined the language surrounding the decision to have an abortion in legal decisions, noting that when the U.S. Supreme Court listed non-life-threatening reasons for abortion, such as convenience and not wanting children, it implied that the pregnant woman's desires outweighed the fetus's possible life. McClain has also written about how abortion opponents describe the decision to have an abortion as an "irresponsible" choice. McClain rejects this idea, noting that many women choose to have an abortion because they believe it would be wrong to bring a child into their current social and economic situation. McClain believes women should have the right to choose abortion in these instances, and she does not believe government should encourage women to refrain from sexual intercourse if they are not prepared to provide for any resulting children.  She has examined the description of men as unable to control their sexual urges as a cultural excuse of men's conduct, and rejects that women should be responsible for ensuring men commit to any children resulting from sexual activity by requiring the couple marry before having sex. Don Browning counters that government encouragement of sexual activity within marriage does not have to burden women with that responsibility, but can move it to the institution of marriage via societal expectations that are placed on both men. McClain, however, believes that American legal and cultural changes have rendered the channeling of sex into marriage obsolete.

Irresponsible language is also applied to women who choose to give birth. McClain has discussed how descriptions of single mothers, teenage mothers, and mothers receiving welfare as irresponsible has led to beliefs that single mothers are immoral.

McClain has asserted that examining abortion through a relational feminist lens puts abortion rights at risk by encouraging women to be legally required to take on traditional responsibilities.

Sex equality
McClain has identified religious influences that encourage female submission and considered how government can promote sex equality on a local level, advocating for pro-sex equality public school instruction and required premarital counseling regarding property ownership and domestic violence. Her writings on public education and sex equality also extend to sex education, where she advocates applying liberal feminist theory of sexuality, which recognizes sexual desire and expression as normal, and expects sexual responsibility from all individuals regardless of gender. In addition to teaching responsibility, sex education should strive to  foster capacity and equality by covering all types of sexual activity and discussing the societal context of sex, gendered messages that have been internalized, and the "sexual double standard."  Other legal scholars have expressed concerns about a public school sex education program that legitimizes various sexual activities when that conflicts with parental teachings. McClain believes government has an obligation to expose children to teachings that vary from their parents' beliefs to encourage open-mindedness and critical thinking. 

McClain has also advocated that governments look beyond marriage and the traditional nuclear family structure when devising programs to help families, so that all types of families' needs are recognized and considered important. This contributes to sex equality by legitimizing family arrangements outside of the traditional male head of household and female caretaker model.

McClain has likened the female body to a castle or sanctuary entitled to the utmost privacy protections extended to the home under tort law with the hope of legally protecting women's sexual autonomy and freedom from physical violence. She has been critical of marital rape exemptions because they disregard women's autonomy, and has not found that husbands' privacy rights justify the exemption or prevent their prosecution for domestic violence.

Family law
McClain's book, The Place of Families: Fostering Capacity, Equality, and Responsibility, is "a feminist vision of the family in moral terms,"  and has been placed between critical feminist theories that seek to discontinue government regulation of marriage and those legal scholars, such as Margaret Brinig and Milton Regan, who favor continued state-governed marriage. She states that the institution of marriage should be retained, but that its benefits should be open to more people, even if they do not want to legally marry, and government programs encouraging marriage need to consider how poverty impacts the ability to sustain healthy relationships. Her work diverts from mainstream family law by arguing that creating equality in and amongst all familial relationships is a moral imperative and a public good. Whereas other scholars believe social institutions can help families prepare children for democratic participation, McClain, with James Fleming, has expressed concerns about relying on civil society institutions with their own agendas for moral education. McClain believes government persuasion is needed to create the appropriate environment by helping working parents through parental leave and subsidies for higher quality care.  The subtitle of The Place of Families, "Fostering Capacity, Equality, and Responsibility," outlines the values significant enough to require government action.

Criticism of McClain's work asks how she can argue government should promote gender equality within families while rejecting state promotion of sexual activity within the confines of marriage. Other government action criticism notes that to create equality among different family types, government must make up deficits experienced by children due to their parents' sub-optimal decisions, and this support could encourage undesired adult behavior.  There is also a question whether government supports can create true equality among different types of families, or whether subsidies create marginalized family groups.  Critics also take issue with McClain's use of the moral good to support all families, regardless of makeup, while ignoring empirical evidence of the enhanced premoral goods some family makeups generally bestow on children. McClain addressed this criticism in a subsequent article, where she acknowledged the channelling function of family law, encouraging people to marry, sometimes conflicts with fairness, but that channelling is still a legitimate purpose of family law, and marriage is something individuals in non-traditional families still strive for. Additionally, some of the institutions, such as the Institute for American Values, associated with empirical evidence showing greater benefits to children in families with low-conflict, two married biological parents, were also quick to turn out reports questioning the future of marriage in response to movement in the same-sex marriage debate.  She has also responded to empirical evidence that women in "traditional" gender role marriages are more satisfied that women in egalitarian relationships, noting that women in traditional marriages likely have lower expectations that are met, whereas women in egalitarian relationships have higher expectations that are met less often. 

McClain has also considered compensation for care work, arguing that raising children well instills traits that allow them to participate in democratic government. She has also examined how women respond to inequality by caring for the disadvantaged, which itself generates societal value. However, while women have traditionally been the primary caretakers, McClain believes government programming should encourage both genders to engage in this important work. She believes caring for children alone is a valuable contribution to society and has criticized the Personal Responsibility and Work Opportunity Act for requiring paid work contributions in addition to care work. However, McClain's recommendations are not simply compensating parents for the caretaking functions they perform; she has argued that caring for children should be considered a public function that is part of good self-government, and as such, society should do more to support parent education, work-life balance, and employment issues in the child care industry. Others have questioned making child care a public value, worried that it would allow majority views to define family. Additionally, there are concerns that employer accommodation of employee mothers will shift the burden to childless female employees instead of all childless employees.

Tort law
Although other legal scholars, such as Leslie Bender, have argued the feminist ethic of care requires a duty to rescue, McClain has disagreed, distinguishing the ethic of care from beneficence.

Publications list

Books
 Linda C. McClain, Who's the Bigot? Learning from Conflicts over Marriage and Civil Rights Law (2020).
 Douglas E. Abrams, Naomi R. Cahn, Catherine J. Ross & Linda C. McClain, Contemporary Family Law (5th ed. 2019).
 James E. Fleming, Sotirios A. Barber, Stephen Macedo & Linda C. McClain, Gay Rights and the Constitution (2016).
 Douglas E. Abrams, Naomi R. Cahn, Catherine J. Ross, David D. Meyer & Linda C. McClain, Contemporary Family Law (4th ed. 2015).
 James E. Fleming & Linda C. McClain, Ordered Liberty: Rights, Responsibilities, and Virtues (2013).
 What is Parenthood? Contemporary Debates about the Family (Eds. Linda C. McClain & Daniel Cere, 2013).
 Gender Equality: Dimensions of Women's Equal Citizenship (Eds. Linda C. McClain & Joanna L. Grossman, 2009).
 Linda C. McClain, The Place of Families: Fostering Capacity, Equality, and Responsibility (2006).

Most-cited articles
According to Google Scholar, HeinOnline, and Web of Science, McClain's most-cited articles include:
 Atomistic Man Revisited: Liberalism, Connection, and Feminist Jurisprudence, 65 S. Cal. L. Rev. 1171 (1992).
 "Irresponsible" Reproduction, 47 Hastings L.J. 339 (1996).
 Rights and Irresponsibility, 43 Duke L.J. 989 (1993).
 Inviobility and Privacy: The Castle, the Sanctuary, and the Body, 7 Yale J.L. & Human. 195 (1995).

References

External links 
 Boston University School of Law profile

1958 births
American women lawyers
Boston University School of Law faculty
Oberlin College alumni
University of Chicago Divinity School alumni
Georgetown University Law Center alumni
New York University School of Law alumni
Hofstra University faculty
Family law in the United States
Equality rights
Living people
American women academics
21st-century American women